Metaxmeste schrankiana is a species of moth of the family Crambidae described by Siegmund von Hochenwarth in 1785. It is found in most of western Europe, including France, the Iberian Peninsula, Scandinavia, Germany, Austria, Switzerland, Greece and the Balkans.

The wingspan is 18–23 mm.

The larvae feed on Vaccinium myrtillus, Vaccinium uliginosum, Vaccinium vitis-idaea and Calluna vulgaris.

References

Odontiini
Moths of Europe
Moths described in 1785